Kushk-e Ghandi (also Romanized as Kūshk-e Ghandī; also known as Kooshk Tayyebi Sarhadi, Kūchak, and Kūshk) is a village in Tayebi-ye Sarhadi-ye Sharqi Rural District, Charusa District, Kohgiluyeh County, Kohgiluyeh and Boyer-Ahmad Province, Iran. At the 2006 census, its population was 62, in 13 families.

References 

Populated places in Kohgiluyeh County